Diapheromerinae is a subfamily of the stick insect family Diapheromeridae. They belong to the superfamily Anareolatae of suborder Verophasmatodea.

The family contains the huge Paraphanocles keratosqueleton, often discussed under its obsolete name Bostra maxwelli and known as godhorse or hag's horse in Barbados. It belongs to the typical tribe of Diapheromerinae, the Diapheromerini. It grows to over 30 cm (12 in) long and is known for its slow-moving stick-like appearance. In A-Z of Barbados Heritage, the species is discussed thus:

Godhorse. The local name of unknown origin for the walking stick insect which may grow to 33 cm. ... Many people are afraid of it, on the grounds that if given a chance, it will crawl into a human ear, though there is no record of any having done so. There is a superstitious belief that the presence of a godhorse around the house means a death will occur at the house.  They are harmless to man but are generally disliked and Rev. Hughes common name of Hag's Horse conveys this.

Systematics
Three tribes are generally recognized in the Diapheromerinae. These, with some notable genera and species are:

Diapheromerini Zompro, 2001  
Selected genera:
 Diapheromera Gray, 1835
 Diapheromera femorata – common American walkingstick, northern walkingstick
 Megaphasma Caudell, 1903
 Pseudosermyle Caudell, 1903
Ocnophilini Günther, 1953
 Dubiophasma Zompro, 2001
 Exocnophila Zompro, 2001
 Ocnophila Brunner von Wattenwyl, 1907
 Parocnophila Zompro, 1998
Oreophoetini Zompro, 2001
 Dyme (phasmid) Stål, 1875
 Libethra Stål, 1875
 Lobolibethra Hennemann & Conle, 2007
 Ocnophiloidea Zompro, 2001
 Oreophoetes Rehn, 1904
 Oreophoetophasma Zompro, 2002

Footnotes

References
  (2003): "Godhorse". In: A-Z of Barbados Heritage: p. 88. Macmillan Caribbean. 
  (2009): Phasmida SpeciesFile – Diapheromerinae. Version of 28 September 2009. Retrieved 19 April 2011.

External links
 
 

Phasmatodea
Taxa named by William Forsell Kirby
Phasmatodea subfamilies